Jens Rinke Kristensen (born 16 April 1990) is a Danish former footballer who played as a goalkeeper.

Club career
Born in Haderslev, Rinke was part of the Midtjylland youth academy, and participated in a trial practice with English Premier League club Everton at age 15. In July 2009, he trialled with AC Horsens but did not manage to secure a contract.

On 1 February 2010, Rinke signed his first senior contract with Kolding FC in the second-tier Danish 1st Division. A year later, on 22 March 2011, he was signed by Fredericia on a contract lasting until the end of the season, after becoming a free agent in Kolding. He established himself as a starter at the club and extended his contract shortly after.

Rinke would later also play for Vestsjælland, SønderjyskE, Silkeborg and Kolding IF. On 1 February 2020, Rinke was released by Kolding IF.

Coaching career
In January 2021, Rinke was hired as an academy goalkeeper coach for his former club SønderjyskE.

International career
He gained one cap for the Denmark under-20 team.

References

1990 births
Living people
Danish men's footballers
Kolding FC players
FC Fredericia players
FC Vestsjælland players
SønderjyskE Fodbold players
Silkeborg IF players
Danish 1st Division players
Danish Superliga players
Association football goalkeepers
Kolding IF players
Danish 2nd Division players
Denmark youth international footballers
People from Haderslev Municipality
FC Midtjylland players
SønderjyskE Fodbold non-playing staff
Sportspeople from the Region of Southern Denmark